The Histoire Naturelle, générale et particulière, avec la description du Cabinet du Roi is an encyclopaedic collection of 36 large (quarto) volumes written between 1749–1804, initially by the Comte de Buffon, and continued in eight more volumes after his death by his colleagues, led by Bernard Germain de Lacépède. The books cover what was known of the "natural sciences" at the time, including what would now be called material science, physics, chemistry and technology as well as the natural history of animals.

Histoire Naturelle, an encyclopaedic work 

The Histoire Naturelle, générale et particulière, avec la description du Cabinet du Roi is the work that the Comte de Buffon (1707–1788) is remembered for. He worked on it for some 50 years, initially at Montbard in his office in the Tour Saint-Louis, then in his library at Petit Fontenet. 36 volumes came out between 1749 and 1789, followed by 8 more after his death, thanks to Bernard Germain de Lacépède. It includes all the knowledge available in his time on the "natural sciences", a broad term that includes disciplines which today would be called material science, physics, chemistry and technology. Buffon notes the morphological similarities between men and apes, although he considered apes completely devoid of the ability to think, differentiating them sharply from human beings. Buffon's attention to internal anatomy made him an early comparative anatomist. "L’intérieur, dans les êtres vivants, est le fond du dessin de la nature", he wrote in his Quadrupèdes, "the interior, in living things, is the foundation of nature's design."

The Histoire Naturelle, which was meant to address the whole of natural history, actually covers only minerals, birds, and the quadrupeds among animals. It is accompanied by some discourses and a theory of the earth by way of introduction, and by supplements including an elegantly written account of the epochs of nature.

The Suppléments cover a wide range of topics; for example, in (Suppléments IV), there is a Discours sur le style (Discourse on Style) and an Essai d'arithmétique morale (essay on Moral Arithmetic).

Louis Jean-Marie Daubenton assisted Buffon on the quadrupeds; Philippe Guéneau de Montbeillard worked on the birds. They were joined, from 1767, by Barthélemy Faujas de Saint-Fond, the abbot Gabriel Bexon and Charles-Nicolas-Sigisbert Sonnini de Manoncourt. The whole descriptive and anatomical part of l’Histoire des Quadrupèdes was the work of Daubenton and Jean-Claude Mertrud.

Buffon attached much importance to the illustrations; Jacques de Sève illustrated the quadrupeds and François-Nicolas Martinet illustrated the birds. Nearly 2000 plates adorn the work, representing animals with care given both to aesthetics and anatomical accuracy, with dreamlike and mythological settings.

On minerals, Buffon collaborated with André Thouin. Barthélemy Faujas de Saint-Fond and Louis Bernard Guyton de Morveau provided sources for the mineral volumes.

L’Histoire Naturelle met immense success, almost as great as Encyclopédie by Diderot, which came out in the same period. The first three volumes of L’Histoire Naturelle, générale et particulière, avec la description du cabinet du Roi were reprinted three times in six weeks.

The encyclopaedia appeared in 36 volumes :
 3 volumes in 1749 : De la manière d’étudier l’histoire naturelle followed by Théorie de la Terre, Histoire Générale des animaux and Histoire Naturelle de l’homme 
 12 volumes on quadrupeds (1753 to 1767)
 9 volumes on birds (1770 to 1783])
 5 volumes on minerals (1783 to 1788), the last including Traité de l’aimant, the last work published by Buffon in his lifetime
 7 volumes of supplements (1774 to 1789), including Époques de la nature (from 1778).

L’Histoire Naturelle was initially printed at the Imprimerie royale in 36 volumes (1749–1789). In 1764 Buffon bought back the rights to his work. It was continued by Bernard Germain de Lacépède, who described the egg-laying quadrupeds, snakes, fishes and cetaceans in 8 volumes (1788–1804).

Buffon was assisted in the work by Jacques-François Artur (1708–1779), Gabriel Léopold Charles Amé Bexon (1748–1785), Louis Jean-Marie Daubenton (1716–1799), Edme-Louis Daubenton (1732–1786), Jacques de Sève (actif 1742–1788), Barthélemy Faujas de Saint-Fond (1741–1819), Philippe Guéneau de Montbeillard (1720–1785), Louis-Bernard Guyton-Morveau (1737–1816), Bernard Germain de Lacépède (1756–1825), François-Nicolas Martinet (1731–1800), the anatomist  (1728–1802), Charles-Nicolas-Sigisbert Sonnini de Manoncourt (1751–1812), and André Thouin (1747–1823).

Approach 

Each group is introduced with a general essay. This is followed by an article, sometimes of many pages, on each animal (or other item). The article on the wolf begins with the claim that it is one of the animals with a specially strong appetite for flesh; it asserts that the animal is naturally coarse and cowardly (grossier et poltron), but becoming crafty at need, and hardy by necessity, driven by hunger. The language, as in this instance, is elegant and elaborate, even "flowery and ornate". Buffon was roundly criticised by his fellow academics for writing a "purely popularizing work, empty and puffed up, with little real scientific value".

The species is named in Greek, Latin, Italian, Spanish, German, English, Swedish, and Polish. The zoological descriptions of the species by Gessner, Ray, Linnaeus, Klein and Buffon himself ("Canis ex griseo flavescens. Lupus vulgaris. Buffon. Reg. animal. pag. 235") are cited.

The text is written as a continuous essay, without the sections on identification, distribution and behaviour that might have been expected from other natural histories. Parts concern human responses rather than the animal itself, as for example that the wolf likes human flesh, and the strongest wolves sometimes eat nothing else. Measurements may be included; in the case of the wolf, 41 separate measurements are tabulated, in pre-revolutionary French feet and inches starting with the "Length of the whole body measured in a straight line from the end of the muzzle to the anus........3 feet. 7 inches." (1.2 m); the "Length of the largest claws" is given as "10 lines" (2.2 cm).

The wolf is illustrated standing in farmland, and as a complete skeleton standing on a stone plinth in a landscape. The account of the species occupies 32 pages including illustrations.

Editions

Buffon's original edition continued by Lacépède 

The original edition of the Histoire Naturelle by Buffon comprised 36 volumes in quarto, divided into the following series: Histoire de la Terre et de l'Homme, Quadrupèdes, Oiseaux, Minéraux, Suppléments. Buffon edited 35 volumes in his lifetime. Soon after his death, the fifth and final volume of l’Histoire des minéraux appeared in 1788 at the Imprimerie des Bâtiments du Roi. The seventh and final volume of Suppléments by Buffon was published posthumously in 1789 through Lacépède's hands. Lacépède continued the part of the Histoire Naturelle which dealt with animals. A few months before Buffon's death, in 1788, Lacépède published, as a continuation, the first volume of his Histoire des Reptiles, on egg-laying quadrupeds. The next year, he wrote a second volume on snakes, published during the French Revolution. Between 1798 and 1803, he brought out the volume Histoire des Poissons. Lacépède made use of the notes and collections left by Philibert Commerson (1727–1773). He wrote Histoire des Cétacés which was printed in 1804. At that point, the Histoire Naturelle, by Buffon and Lacépède, thus contained 44 quarto volumes forming the definitive edition.

Variations in the editions by Buffon and Lacépède 

Another edition in quarto format was printed by the Imprimerie royale in 36 volumes (1774–1804). It consisted of 28 volumes by Buffon, and 8 volumes by Lacépède. The part containing anatomical articles by Louis Jean-Marie Daubenton was dropped. The supplements were merged into the relevant articles in the main volumes.

The Imprimerie royale also published two editions of the Histoire Naturelle in duodecimo format (1752–1805), occupying 90 or 71 volumes, depending on whether or not they included the part on anatomy. In this print format, the original work by Buffon occupied 73 volumes  with the part on anatomy, or 54 volumes without the part on anatomy. The continuation by Lacépède took up 17 duodecimo volumes.

A de luxe edition of Histoire Naturelle des Oiseaux (Birds) (1771–1786) was produced by the Imprimerie royale in 10 folio and quarto volumes, with 1008 engraved and hand-coloured plates, executed under Buffon's personal supervision by Edme-Louis Daubenton, cousin and brother-in-law of Buffon's principal collaborator.

Translations 

The Histoire Naturelle was translated into languages including English, German, Swedish, Russian and Italian. Many translations, often partial (single volumes, or all volumes to a certain date), abridged, reprinted in the same translation by different printers, or with additional text (for example on insects) and new illustrations, were made at the end of the eighteenth century and the start of the nineteenth century, presenting a complicated publication history. Early translations were necessarily only of the earlier volumes. Given the complexity, all catalogue dates other than of single volumes should be taken as approximate.

R. Griffith published an early translation of the volume on The Horse in London in 1762. T. Bell published a translation of the first six volumes in London between 1775 and 1776. William Creech published an edition in Edinburgh between 1780 and 1785. T. Cadell and W. Davies published another edition in London in 1812. An abridged edition was published by Wogan, Byrne et al. in Dublin in 1791; that same year R. Morison and Son of Perth, J. and J. Fairbairn of Edinburgh and T. Kay and C. Forster of London published their edition. W. Strahan and T. Cadell published a translation with notes by the encyclopaedist William Smellie in London around 1785. Barr's Buffon in ten volumes was published in London between 1797 and 1807. W. Davidson published an abridged version including the natural history of insects taken from Swammerdam, Brookes, Goldsmith et al., with "elegant engravings on wood"; its four volumes appeared in Alnwick in 1814.

German translations include those published by Joseph Georg Trassler 1784–1785; by Pauli, 1772–1829; Grund and Holle, 1750–1775; and Johann Samuel Heinsius, 1756–1782.

Italian translations include those published by Fratelle Bassaglia around 1788 and Boringherieri in 1959.

Per Olof Gravander translated an 1802–1803 French abridgement into Swedish, publishing it in Örebro in 1806–1807.

A Russian version (The General and Particular Natural History by Count Buffon; "Всеобщая и частная естественная история графа Бюффона") was brought out by The Imperial Academy of Sciences (Императорской Академией Наук) in St. Petersburg between 1789 and 1808.

Children's 

An abridged edition for children was published by Frederick Warne in London and Scribner, Welford and Co. c. 1870.

Contents by volume

The original edition was arranged as follows:

Natural history, and description of the king's cabinet of curiosities
 Volume I : Premier Discours - De la manière d’étudier et de traiter l’histoire naturelle, Second Discours - Histoire et théorie de la Terre, Preuves de la théorie de la Terre, 1749
 Volume II : Histoire générale des Animaux, Histoire Naturelle de l'Homme, 1749
 Volume III : Description du cabinet du Roi, Histoire Naturelle de l'Homme, 1749

Quadrupèdes (Quadrupeds)
 Volume IV (Quadrupèdes I) : Discours sur la nature des Animaux, Les Animaux domestiques, 1753
 Volume V (Quadrupèdes II) : 1755
 Volume VI (Quadrupèdes III) : Les Animaux sauvages, 1756
 Volume VII (Quadrupèdes IV) : Les Animaux carnassiers, 1758
 Volume VIII (Quadrupèdes V) : 1760
 Volume IX (Quadrupèdes VI) : 1761
 Volume X (Quadrupèdes VII) : 1763
 Volume XI (Quadrupèdes VIII) : 1764
 Volume XII (Quadrupèdes IX) : 1764
 Volume XIII (Quadrupèdes X) : 1765
 Volume XIV (Quadrupèdes XI) : Nomenclature des Singes, De la dégénération des Animaux, 1766
 Volume XV (Quadrupèdes XII) : 1767

Histoire Naturelle des Oiseaux (Birds) (1770–1783)

 Volume XVI (Oiseaux I) : 1770
 Volume XVII (Oiseaux II) : 1771
 Volume XVIII (Oiseaux III) : 1774
 Volume XIX (Oiseaux IV) : 1778
 Volume XX (Oiseaux V) : 1778
 Volume XXI (Oiseaux VI) : 1779
 Volume XXII (Oiseaux VII) : 1780
 Volume XXIII (Oiseaux VIII) : 1781
 Volume XXIV (Oiseaux IX) : 1783

Histoire Naturelle des Minéraux (Minerals) (1783–1788)
 Volume XXV (Minéraux I) : 1783
 Volume XXVI (Minéraux II) : 1783
 Volume XXVII (Minéraux III) : 1785
 Volume XXVIII (Minéraux IV) : 1786
 Volume XXIX (Minéraux V) : Traité de l'Aimant et de ses usages, 1788

Suppléments à l’Histoire Naturelle, générale et particulière (Supplements) (1774–1789)
 Volume XXX (Suppléments I) : Servant de suite à la Théorie de la Terre, et d’introduction à l’Histoire des Minéraux, 1774
 Volume XXXI (Suppléments II) : Servant de suite à la Théorie de la Terre, et de préliminaire à l’Histoire des Végétaux - Parties Expérimentale & Hypothétique, 1775
 Volume XXXII (Suppléments III) : Servant de suite à l'Histoire des Animaux quadrupèdes, 1776
 Volume XXXIII (Suppléments IV) : Servant de suite à l'Histoire Naturelle de l'Homme, 1777
 Volume XXXIV (Suppléments V) : Des Époques de la nature, 1779
 Volume XXXV (Suppléments VI) : Servant de suite à l'Histoire des Animaux quadrupèdes, 1782
 Volume XXXVI (Suppléments VII) : Servant de suite à l'Histoire des Animaux quadrupèdes, 1789

Histoire Naturelle des Quadrupèdes ovipares et des Serpents (Egg-laying Quadrupeds and Snakes) (1788–1789)

 Volume XXXVII (Reptiles I) : Histoire générale et particulière des Quadrupèdes ovipares, 1788
 Volume XXXVIII (Reptiles II) : Histoire des Serpents, 1789

Histoire Naturelle des Poissons (Fish) (1798–1803)
 Volume XXXIX (Poissons I) : 1798
 Volume XXXX (Poissons II) : 1800
 Volume XXXXI (Poissons III) : 1802
 Volume XXXXII (Poissons IV) : 1802
 Volume XXXXIII (Poissons V) : 1803

Histoire Naturelle des Cétacés (Cetaceans) (1804)
 Volume XXXXIV (Cétacés) : 1804

Reception

Contemporary

The Histoire Naturelle had a distinctly mixed reception in the eighteenth century. Wealthy homes in both England and France purchased copies, and the first edition was sold out within six weeks. But Buffon was criticised by some priests for suggesting (in the essay Les Epoques de Nature, Volume XXXIV) that the earth was more than 6,000 years old and that mountains had arisen in geological time. Buffon cites as evidence that fossil sea-shells had been found at the tops of mountains; but the claim was seen as contradicting the biblical account in the Book of Genesis. Buffon also disagreed with Linnaeus's system of classifying plants as described in Systema Naturae (1735). In Buffon's view, expounded in the "Premier Discours" of the Histoire Naturelle (1749), the concept of species was entirely artificial, the only real entity in nature being the individual; as for a taxonomy based on the number of stamens or pistils in a flower, mere counting (despite Buffon's own training in mathematics) had no bearing on nature.

The Paris faculty of theology, acting as the official censor, wrote to Buffon with a list of statements in the Histoire Naturelle that were contradictory to Roman Catholic Church teaching. Buffon replied that he believed firmly in the biblical account of creation, and was able to continue printing his book, and remain in position as the leader of the 'old school', complete with his job as director of the royal botanical garden. On Buffon's death, the 19-year-old Georges Cuvier celebrated with the words "This time, the Comte de Buffon is dead and buried". Soon afterwards, the French revolution went much further in sweeping away old attitudes to natural history, along with much else.

Modern

Philosophy 
The Stanford Encyclopedia of Philosophy calls the Histoire Naturelle "Buffon's major work", observing that "In addressing the history of the earth, Buffon also broke with the 'counter-factual' tradition of Descartes, and presented a secular and realist account of the origins of the earth and its life forms." In its view, the work created an "age of Buffon", defining what natural history itself was, while Buffon's "Discourse on Method" (unlike that of Descartes) at the start of the work argued that repeated observation could lead to a greater certainty of knowledge even than "mathematical analysis of nature". Buffon also led natural history away from the natural theology of British parson-naturalists such as John Ray. He thus offered both a new methodology and an empirical style of enquiry. Buffon's position on evolution is complex; he noted in Volume 4 from Daubenton's comparative anatomy of the horse and the donkey that species might "transform", but initially (1753) rejected the possibility. However, in doing so he changed the definition of a species from a fixed or universal class (which could not change, by definition) to "the historical succession of ancestor and descendant linked by material connection through generation", identified by the ability to mate and produce fertile offspring. Thus the horse and donkey, which produce only sterile hybrids, are seen empirically not to be the same species, even though they have similar anatomy. That empirical fact leaves open the possibility of evolution.

Style 

The botanist Sandra Knapp writes that "Buffon's prose was so purple that the ideas themselves are almost hidden", observing that this was also the contemporary academic opinion. She notes that some quite radical ideas are to be found in his work, but they are almost invisible, given the language they are cloaked in. She quotes Buffon's dramatic description of the lion, which along with the engraving in her view "emphasized both the lion's regal bearing and personality not only in his text but also in the illustration... A reader was left in no doubt as to the importance and character of the animal." She concludes "No wonder the cultured aristocratic public lapped it up – the text reads more like a romantic novel than a dry scientific treatise".

Evolutionary thought 

The evolutionary biologist Ernst Mayr comments that "In this monumental and fascinating Histoire naturelle, Buffon dealt in a stimulating manner with almost all the problems that would subsequently be raised by evolutionists. Written in a brilliant style, this work was read in French or in one of the numerous translations by every educated person in Europe". Mayr argued that "virtually all the well-known writers of the Enlightenment" were "Buffonians", and calls Buffon "the father of all thought in natural history in the second half of the eighteenth century".

Mayr notes that Buffon was not an "evolutionist", but was certainly responsible for creating the great amount of interest in natural history in France. He agrees that Buffon's thought is hard to classify and even self-contradictory, and that the theologians forced him to avoid writing some of his opinions openly. Mayr argues however that Buffon was "fully aware of the possibility of 'common descent', and was perhaps the first author ever to articulate it clearly", quoting Buffon at length, starting with "Not only the ass and the horse, but also man, the apes, the quadrupeds, and all the animals might be regarded as constituting but a single family", and later "that man and ape have a common origin", and that "the power of nature...with sufficient time, she has been able from a single being to derive all the other organized beings". Mayr notes, however, that Buffon immediately rejects the suggestion and offers three arguments against it, namely that no new species have arisen in historical times; that hybrid infertility firmly separates species; and that animals intermediate between, say, the horse and the donkey are not seen (in the fossil record).

Notes

References 

Natural history
1749 books
French books
French encyclopedias
Natural history books
18th-century encyclopedias
19th-century encyclopedias